Ethmia heliomela is a moth in the family Depressariidae. It is found in Australia in southern Queensland and northern New South Wales.

The forewings are grey, with a satin sheen and two black dots. The hindwings are yellow with black tips.

The larvae feed on Ehretia acuminata. They live in webs amongst the flowers of the host plant. Initially they feed on the flowers, but may also eat the leaves when they mature. They are dark green and black. Pupation takes place under the bark.

References

Moths described in 1923
heliomela